The 2008 World Deaf Football Championships were the first edition of the international competition of deaf football national men's and women's teams. They were organized by the International Committee of Sports for the Deaf (CISS), and were held in Patras, Greece between 1-12 July 2008. In the men's championship, Germany won the title for the first time, defeating Turkey in the final, France became bronze medalist before the Umited States. In the women's championship, Russia  won the title for the first time, defeating Germany in the final, England became bronze medalist before South Africa.

Rankings

Men

Women

References

2008
International association football competitions hosted by Greece
2008 in disability sport
Deaf
2008 in association football
Sport in Patras